Christy Bonevacia (born 25 December 1985 in Willemstad, Curaçao in the former Netherlands Antilles) is a Curaçao footballer who currently plays for Dutch amateur side VVA '71.

Club career
Bonevacia came through the youth ranks at AZ and in 2005, he played for AZ in the UEFA Cup semi-final against Sporting Portugal. He then played for Eerste Divisie sides Emmen and Haarlem before moving to Spakenburg.

Personal life
He works for a security company.

External links
 Profile at VI
 Player profile - SV Spakenburg

1985 births
Living people
People from Willemstad
Association football midfielders
Curaçao footballers
Curaçao international footballers
AZ Alkmaar players
FC Emmen players
HFC Haarlem players